Tol-e Sar Kuh (also Romanized as Tol-e Sar Kūh and Tall-e Sarkūh; also known as Tol-e Sarkūb) is a village in Zirrah Rural District, Sadabad District, Dashtestan County, Bushehr Province, Iran. At the 2006 census, its population was 1,036, in 206 families.

References 

Populated places in Dashtestan County